Hocabá Municipality (In the Yucatec Maya Language: “picking plums” is one of the 106 municipalities in the Mexican state of Yucatán containing   of land and located roughly  southeast of the city of Mérida.

History
During pre-Hispanic times, the area was part of the chieftainship of Hocabail-Humúny. After the conquest the area became part of the encomienda system. In 1549, the encomendero for Hocabá was Gaspar Pacheco and it was later assigned to Pedro Alvarez.

Yucatán declared its independence from the Spanish Crown in 1821 and in 1825, the area was assigned to the Beneficios Bajos region with its headquarters in Sotuta. In 1900 Hocabá was elevated to village, which included administration of Sahcabá and Sanahcat. In 1922 the estate San Juan was withdrawn from the municipality and in 1924, the relationship with Sanahcat was severed. In 1937, the  Hacienda Tixcacal Ancona and Hacienda Xtohil were added to the municipality.

Governance
The municipal president is elected for a three-year term. The town council has nine councilpersons, who serve as Secretary and councilors of educational programs, culture and sports; public lighting; health and social assistance; public image; markets and roads; public works; public monuments; and nomenclature.

The Municipal Council administers the business of the municipality. It is responsible for budgeting and expenditures and producing all required reports for all branches of the municipal administration. Annually it determines educational standards for schools.

The Police Commissioners ensure public order and safety. They are tasked with enforcing regulations, distributing materials and administering rulings of general compliance issued by the council.

Climate 

Soil 
Hocabá has calcareous soil which is in red and black colour. Kankab soil that has a reddish-brown colour is also found. These soil types  are high in calcium carbonate. The area also has formations that are relatively rocky and are considered poor for farming. Under these soil conditions the land-use in the area consists of forests, home gardening, and short term farming (two to four years). The crops grown are maize, beans, and pumpkins.

Communities
The head of the municipality is Hocabá, Yucatán. The other populated areas are Hacienda Buenavista, Jesús, Sahcabá, Salaactún, San Antonio, San Juan Evia, and Temozón. The significant populations are shown below:

Local festivals
Every year from 23 to 30 September a celebration in honor of St. Francis of Assisi is held.

Tourist attractions
 Church of St. Francis of Assisi 
 Church of San Cristóbal built in the 17th century
 Hacienda Buenavista
 Hacienda Xucú

The two towers in the facade of the Church of St. Francis of Assisi, dated to 1764, has stucco escutcheon and a theme of a pastern of stars. There are paintings along the long nave many of which are of saints including that of Saint Francis, the patron saint of Hocabá and also of the Saint Anthony of Padua. The altar is in a very good condition, its pilasters are gilded and carved with flower designs and is set with an ivory background. The pediment in the façade has a scrolled crest. There is spiral staircase to approach the roof of the church.

There is another church Hocabá called the "ermita of Sana Cruz" which has a chapel and a belfry. The nave has no roof.

References

Bibliography 

Municipalities of Yucatán